List of Roman (Latin) place names in Serbia.

References
MOESIA

Serbia
Roman place names
Serbia
Serbia
Serbia
Serbia